Harry Harrison Kroll (1888–1967) was a writer, illustrator and English professor whose students included Jesse Stuart.(Source: To Teach, To Love, by Jesse Stuart.) He wrote the novel Cabin in the Cotton which was adapted into the film The Cabin in the Cotton. The University of Tennessee and Mississippi State University have collections of his papers. Richard Saunders wrote a book about him. Kroll is described as a Southern ruralist writer in a review of it by Ricky Cox.

The Cabin in the Cotton includes the famous line "I'd like ta kiss ya, but I just washed my hair."

Bibliography
The Cabin in the Cotton (1931)
Darker Grows The Valley
Mounds in the Mist
Perilous Journey: A Tale of the Mississippi River and the Natchez Trace (1943)
The Ancient Grudge (1946)
The Usurper
Fury in the Earth: a novel of the New Madrid Earthquake
Riders in the Night (1965)

References

American writers
American illustrators